Bert Kreischer (born November 3, 1972), nicknamed "The Machine", is an American stand-up comedian, podcaster, reality television host and actor. In 1997, he was featured in an article in Rolling Stone while attending Florida State University. The magazine named Kreischer "the top partyer at the Number One Party School in the country." The article also served as inspiration for the 2002 film National Lampoon's Van Wilder. Kreischer has served as host of the television series Hurt Bert on FX as well as Bert the Conqueror and Trip Flip on Travel Channel. He is slated to appear in The Machine, a comedy film based on his life.

He is the producer and host of Bertcast, a weekly comedy podcast on the All Things Comedy network. He is also the co-host of the 2 Bears, 1 Cave podcast with fellow comedian Tom Segura, and co-host of the Bill Bert podcast with actor and comedian Bill Burr.

Early life 
Albert Kreischer Jr. was born November 3, 1972, in St. Petersburg, Florida, and raised in Tampa. His mother worked in early childhood development and his father worked as a real-estate attorney. He attended a private Jesuit high school then went on to attend Florida State University (FSU). Kreischer majored in English and was a member of the Alpha Tau Omega fraternity.

In 1997, during Kreischer's sixth year at FSU, the university was ranked number one by The Princeton Review in their annual list of the top "party schools" in the United States. Later that same year Kreischer became the focus of a six-page article in Rolling Stone who named him "the top partyer at the Number One Party School in the country." Titled "Bert Kreischer: The Undergraduate," the article recounted Kreischer's party hijinks, which included bouts of heavy drinking and public nudity. From the Rolling Stone article director Oliver Stone optioned the rights to Kreischer's life. When the development deal with Oliver Stone fell through, all the scripts that were submitted went back to their writers. One of these writers changed Kreischer's name and sold the script to National Lampoon. This became the basis for the 2002 film National Lampoon's Van Wilder, starring Ryan Reynolds.

When asked about his involvement in the film, Kreischer told the New York Post in 2014: "I've never seen it. I had nothing to do with it." On Joe Rogan's podcast, Kreischer talked about how National Lampoon executives confirmed to him that he was the basis for the film. He also confirmed that he would never sue National Lampoon for having made the movie without his involvement.

Personal life 
Kreischer lives in Los Angeles with his wife LeeAnn and their two daughters.

Career

Stand-up comedy 
Kreischer's first experience with stand-up comedy was at Potbelly's, a bar and nightclub in Tallahassee, Florida. Kreischer moved to New York City after a tape of one of his sets was sent to a talent agent who invited him to the city to watch some stand-up shows. Kreischer worked the door at the now-defunct Boston Comedy Club.

Kreischer is known for performing stand-up comedy while shirtless. He is also known for his storytelling; his most popular story is about how he allegedly earned the nickname "The Machine". The story revolves around how he inadvertently helped the Russian mafia rob a train while on a college trip to Russia.

In 2004, Kreischer was featured along with four other comedians on the DVD release National Lampoon Live: New Faces – Volume 2. That same year one of his stories appeared on an episode of the animated Comedy Central series Shorties Watchin' Shorties.

As a stand-up comedian Kreischer has performed internationally and has appeared on late night talk shows Late Show with David Letterman, Jimmy Kimmel Live and Conan. He also appeared regularly as a guest on Rachael Ray from 2011 to 2015.

In 2009, his first comedy special Bert Kreischer: Comfortably Dumb appeared on Comedy Central. His second special Bert Kreischer: The Machine was released in 2016 on Showtime.

In 2015, he appeared on Comedy Central's comedy storytelling series This Is Not Happening. His story for the show was about his experience wrestling a bear for the television series Hurt Bert.

In August 2018, Kreischer released Bert Kreischer: Secret Time on Netflix, Filming took place in Philadelphia.

In March 2020, Kreischer released Bert Kreischer: Hey Big Boy on Netflix, Filming took place in Cleveland.

Specials

Appearances

Podcasting 
Kreischer produces and hosts Bertcast, a weekly comedy podcast on the All Things Comedy network. Launched in 2012, Bert records his podcast from his Man Cave that was built for him for an episode of Man Caves, a home improvement reality television program. Kreischer co-hosts the 2 Bears 1 Cave podcast with Tom Segura, and the Bill Bert podcast with Bill Burr.

Kreischer has also been a guest on podcasts such as WTF with Marc Maron, Doug Benson's Doug Loves Movies, H3 Podcast, Your Mom's House and The Joe Rogan Experience.

Published works 
 - Total pages: 256

Other media 
Within five months of moving to New York City to pursue a career in comedy, Will Smith's Production Company offered Kreischer a deal for a sitcom. When he was featured on Bert the Conqueror, Kreischer traveled to amusement parks and other entertainment venues across the United States in order to experience thrilling rides and activities. Kreischer, who has a fear of heights, can be seen riding roller coasters and other amusement park rides as well as engaging in activities such as jumping off the Stratosphere tower in Las Vegas and being fired from a human slingshot. While in New York Kreischer attended open mics hosted by TV producer DJ Nash that were also attended by the likes of Demetri Martin, Bobby Kelly and Jim Norton. In 2001 Kreischer also starred in a television pilot based on Nash's life titled Life With David J.

References

General sources

External links 

1972 births
Living people
20th-century American comedians
21st-century American comedians
American male comedians
American podcasters
American stand-up comedians
Comedians from Florida
Florida State University alumni
Jesuit High School (Tampa) alumni
People from Tampa, Florida
Television personalities from Florida